The Bots are an American, Los Angeles-based indie rock band, founded by brothers Mikaiah Lei and Anaiah Lei.  They perform garage punk music.

Rolling Stone named them an artist "Most Likely To Succeed in 2014" during their coverage of acts performing at the annual Coachella Music Festival.

The Bots had already self released an album and three EPs before they signed to Fader Label in 2013. The band debuted their album Pink Palms in October 2014 via Fader.

In 2021, The Bots released their sophomore album 2 Seater, featuring new drummer Alex Vincent (also of Los Angeles act Stop Thought). The record was recorded and produced in Austin, Texas by Adrian Quesada of Grammy-Award-nominated band Black Pumas.

Discography

Albums 

 2004 - Truth
 2014 - Pink Palms
 2021 - 2 Seater

Extended play 

 2010 - Black and White Lights

Singles 

 2010 - "No One Knows"
 2013 - "Sincerely Sorry"

Live performances
Osa Do Mar, Spain (2017)
Afro-Punk, London (2017)
Reading and Leeds, UK (2015)
Edgefest, Toronto (2015)
Riot Fest, Toronto (2014)
FunFunFun Fest (2014)
Afropunk Festival (2014)
Bonnaroo (2014)
Coachella (2014)
Outside Lands (2014)
Summer Sonic Festival (2014)
Lowlands Festival (2012)
Vans Warped Tours (2011)

References

External links 
 Official site 

Garage punk groups

Alternative rock groups from California